Franch Casadei (born 9 January 1958) is a Sammarinese judoka. He competed at the 1980, 1984 and the 1988 Summer Olympics.

References

1958 births
Living people
Sammarinese male judoka
Olympic judoka of San Marino
Judoka at the 1980 Summer Olympics
Judoka at the 1984 Summer Olympics
Judoka at the 1988 Summer Olympics
Place of birth missing (living people)